Poa alpigena is a species of grass occurring in mountainous regions. Its specific epithet "alpigena" means "growing in the alpine".

Description
Its glumes are lance-ovate, with the second glume sometime reaching to the middle of the lemma above it. The nerves of the glumes range from glabrous to scabrous, and the lemmas are minutely pubescent.

Poa alpigena has a similar habit to Poa arida, only taller. The most distinguishing characteristic of P. alpigena is its curved underground stem.

The grass flowers from June to August.

Distribution and habitat
Poa alpigena occurs in alpine meadows, wet slopes, bogs, and other similar wet areas. It can be found from Greenland and Labrador to the Yukon, and as far south as Newfoundland, Michigan, Prince Edward Island, and the alpine areas of the White Mountains. In terms of soil content, P. alpigena prefers loose, deep soil, especially sandy alluvium.

References

Plants described in 1918
alpigena